Gabriel Massuca Teca (born 2 February 1991) is an Angolan handball player for Primeiro de Agosto and the Angolan national team.

He participated at the 2017 World Men's Handball Championship.

References

1991 births
Living people
Angolan male handball players
Competitors at the 2019 African Games
African Games competitors for Angola
African Games medalists in handball
African Games gold medalists for Angola